In the chivalric romance prose works in the legend of King Arthur, Cameliard (various French and other spellings include Ca[r]melide, Camiliard, Carmalide, Carmelide,  Carmelyde, Charmelide, Tamalide, Tameli[r]de, and T[h]armelide) is the kingdom of the young Princess Guinevere, ruled by her father, King Leodegrance. The texts identify it variably, with the main version of the Vulgate Merlin locating it between Bedingran (Sherwood Forest) and Norgales (North Wales). Its historical roots may be in Cornwall.

The kingdom's greatest city and apparent capital is the wealthy Carhaix (Camaheu, Carahais, Carahaix, Carahes, Caraheu, Caro[h]aise, Carohaize, Carohase, Carol[h]aise, Karohaise, Karahais, Karahes, Toraise, Torayse), other important cities include Aneblayse (Danbleys, Danebleise, Denebleise). Both of them become major battlefields when they are besieged by the Saxons led by King Ryons until the young King Arthur and his King Ban and King Bors allies arrive with Merlin to the rescue. The knights from Cameliard include Cleodalis (Cliodalis), the kingdom's seneschal and father of Guinevere's half-sister Genievre, and Guyomar, a cousin of Guinevere and one of early lovers of her sister-in-law Morgan. It was also at Cameliard that the Round Table had been kept prior to being given to Arthur by Leodegrance as part of Guinevere's dowry.

References

Bibliography
 Ashley, Mike. The Mammoth Book of King Arthur: Reality and Legend, the Beginning and the End--The Most Complete Arthurian Sourcebook Ever. Carroll & Graf, 2005.
 Lupack, Alan. The Oxford Guide to Arthurian Literature and Legend. Oxford University Press, 2007.

Locations associated with Arthurian legend
Fictional European countries